Abacetus tibialis is a species of ground beetle in the subfamily Pterostichinae. It was described by Maximilien Chaudoir in 1878.

References

tibialis
Beetles described in 1878